IIHF European Women's Champions Cup (EWCC) was an annual women's ice hockey club tournament, contested by the national women's ice hockey champions from several European ice hockey playing nations. The event was established and organized by the International Ice Hockey Federation (IIHF). The competition format included two group phases followed by a final round. Each phase was played as a round robin in groups of four teams each.

History

The competition was created in 2004, at the same time as the similar competition for men's hockey teams. The first winner was the Swedish club AIK IF. This Swedish club team then won the following three tournaments. From 2009 onward, the IIHF European Women's Champions Cup was won by Russian women's teams, with the exception of the tournament in 2010–2011, which was won by a club team from Finland, Ilves Tampere.

Winners

Champion team rosters

2004–05

2005–06

2006–07

2007–08

2008–09

2009–10

2010–11

2011–12

2012–13

2013–14

2014–15

Best Players Selected by the Directorate

 = Second-time Best Player selection

See also
 EWHL Super Cup
IIHF European Women Championship
IIHF European Champions Cup

References

External links

 European Women's Champions Cup
 Summary of the 2007 tournament at hockeyarchives.info 
 European Women's Champions Cup 2007–08
 European Women's Champions Cup's TOURNAMENT REPORTS 2007–08
 European Women's Champions Cup 2010
 European Women's Champions Cup 2011 Preliminary
 European Women's Champions Cup's Tournament Reports 2010–11
 IIHF European Women's Champions Cup 2014/2015 Tournament on the-sports.org

IIHF European Women's Champions Cup
International Ice Hockey Federation tournaments
Women's ice hockey competitions in Europe
Women's ice hockey tournaments
Ice hockey tournaments in Europe
Defunct ice hockey competitions in Europe
Recurring sporting events established in 2004
2004 establishments in Europe
Recurring sporting events disestablished in 2015
2015 disestablishments in Europe
Multi-national professional sports leagues